Acinetobacter variabilis is a bacterium from the genus Acinetobacter which has been isolated from human urine in Malmö in Sweden.

References

Further reading

External links
Type strain of Acinetobacter variabilis at BacDive -  the Bacterial Diversity Metadatabase

Moraxellaceae
Bacteria described in 2015